The International Conference on Theory and Practice of Digital Libraries (TPDL) started in 1997 as the European Conference on Research and Advanced Technology on Digital Libraries (ECDL). The first DELOS Working Group, partially funded by the European Union, laid the foundations for the establishment of a European Research Community on Digital Libraries. The conference has become a notable European forum focusing on digital libraries and associated technical, practical, and social issues. The conference invites papers on the wide range of topics of interest in this field, to the national and international community.

Conferences
As the European Conference on Research and Advanced Technology for Digital Libraries (ECDL).

 ECDL 1997 - 1st edition held in Pisa (Italy) from September 1 to September 3  Proceedings  LNCS 1324
 ECDL 1998 - 2nd edition held in Heraklion (Greece) from September 21 to September 23  Proceedings  LNCS 1513
 ECDL 1999 - 3rd edition held in Paris (France) from September 22 to September 24  Proceedings  LNCS 1696
 ECDL 2000 - 4th edition held in Lisbon (Portugal) from September 18 to September 20  Proceedings  LNCS 1923
 ECDL 2001 - 5th edition held in Darmstadt (Germany) from September 4 to September 9  Proceedings  LNCS 2163
 ECDL 2002 - 6th edition held in Rome (Italy) from September 16 to September 18  Proceedings  LNCS 2458
 ECDL 2003 - 7th edition held in Trondheim (Norway) from August 17 to August 22  Proceedings  LNCS 2769
 ECDL 2004 - 8th edition held in Bath (UK) from September 12 to September 17  Proceedings  LNCS 3232
 ECDL 2005 - 9th edition held in Vienna (Austria) from September 18 to September 23  Proceedings  LNCS 3652
 ECDL 2006 - 10th edition held in Alicante (Spain) from September 17 to September 22  Proceedings  LNCS 4172
 ECDL 2007 - 11th edition held in Budapest (Hungary) from September 14 to September 19  Proceedings  LNCS 4675
 ECDL 2008 - 12th edition held in Aarhus (Denmark) from September 14 to September 19   LNCS 5173
 ECDL 2009 - 13th edition held in Corfu (Greece) from September 27 to October 2   Proceedings  LNCS 5714
 ECDL 2010 - 14th edition held in Glasgow (UK) from September 6 to September 10  Proceedings  LNCS 6273

In 2011 the conference was renamed to International Conference on Theory and Practice of Digital Libraries (TPDL).
 TPDL 2011 - 15th edition held in Berlin (Germany) from September 25 to September 29  Proceedings  LNCS 6966
 TPDL 2012 - 16th edition held in Paphos (Cyprus) from September 23 to September 29  Proceedings  LNCS 7489
 TPDL 2013 - 17th edition held in Valletta (Malta) from September 22 to September 26  Proceedings  LNCS 8092
 TPDL 2014 - 18th edition held London (UK) from September 8 to September 12. Jointly with JCDL. Proceedings 
 TPDL 2015 - 19th edition held in Poznań (Poland) from September 14 to September 18  Proceedings  LNCS 9316
 TPDL 2016 - 20th edition held in Hannover (Germany) from September 5 to September 9  Proceedings  LNCS 9819
 TPDL 2017 - 21st edition held in Thessaloniki (Greece) from September 18 to September 21  Proceedings  LNCS 10450
 TPDL 2018 - 22nd edition held in - Porto (Portugal) from September 10 to September 13  Proceedings  LNCS 11057
 TPDL 2019 - 23rd edition held in - Oslo (Norway) from September 9 to September 12  Proceedings  LNCS 11799
 TPDL 2020 - 24th edition held in Lyon (France) from August 25 to August 27  Proceedings  LNCS 12246
 TPDL 2021 - 25th edition hosted online by The Open University from September 13 to September 17  Proceedings  LNCS 12866
 TPDL 2022 - 26th edition to be held in - Padua (Italy) from September 20 to September 23

See also
The European Library
Europeana
Joint Conference on Digital Libraries

References

Further reading
 Agosti, M., Borbinha, J., Kapidakis, S., Papatheodorou, C., and Tsakonas, G. (eds). Research and Advanced Technology for Digital Libraries, 13th European Conference, ECDL 2009, Corfu, Greece, September 27-October 2, 2009. Proceedings, Springer, LNCS, Vol. 5714  
 Lalmas, M., Jose, J., Rauber, R., Sebastiani, F., and Frommholz, I. (2010) Research and Advanced Technology for Digital Libraries, 14th European Conference, ECDL 2010, Glasgow, UK, September 6–10, 2010. Proceedings, Springer, LNCS, Vol. 6273

External links
 European Conference on Digital Libraries | European Conference on Research and Advanced Technology for Digital Libraries Istituto di Scienza e Tecnologie dell'Informazione National Research Council (Italy)
 Information on the DELOS Network of Excellence
 International Conference on Theory and Practice of Digital Libraries (TPDL) Conference Series Website
 SpringerLink to the TPDL Conference Series
 Joint Conference on Digital Libraries

Digital libraries
Academic conferences
Technology conferences
Internet and the European Union